Duingen is a former Samtgemeinde ("collective municipality") in the district of Hildesheim, in Lower Saxony, Germany. Its seat was in the village Duingen. On 1 November 2016 it was merged into the new Samtgemeinde Leinebergland.

The Samtgemeinde Duingen consisted of the following municipalities:

 Coppengrave 
 Duingen
 Hoyershausen 
 Marienhagen 
 Weenzen

Former Samtgemeinden in Lower Saxony